Harold Adams may refer to:
Richard Adams (British politician) (Harold Richard Adams, 1912–1978)
Doug Adams (baseball) (Harold Douglas Adams, born 1943), American baseball player

See also
Harry Adams (disambiguation)